Athamanika or Tzoumerka (Greek: Αθαμανικά or Τζουμέρκα) is a mountain range in northwestern Greece, part of the wider Pindus mountain range. Its highest point is the mountain Kakarditsa, at 2,429 m. Its length is approximately 40 km from north to south and its width is approximately 15 to 20 km from east to west. The only major road crossing the Athamanika is the Greek National Road 30 (Arta - Trikala - Karditsa - Volos).

Geography

The Athamanika is situated on the borders of the regional units of Arta, Ioannina, Karditsa and Trikala. It covers (part of) the municipalities North Tzoumerka, Central Tzoumerka, Pyli and Argithea.

It has a low population density. Forests dominate the low-lying areas of the mountain. Grasslands, shrubs and barren rocks dominate the higher elevations. The main rivers draining the Athamanika are the Arachthos in the west, and the Achelous in the east.

History

The Athamanika mountain range became the main base of the EDES resistance organization during the Axis occupation of Greece (1941-1944).

See also
List of mountains in Greece

References

External links
  Greek Mountain Flora

Landforms of Arta (regional unit)
Mountain ranges of Greece
Landforms of Ioannina (regional unit)
Landforms of Trikala (regional unit)
Landforms of Epirus (region)
Landforms of Thessaly
Pindus